Hellinsia aethiopicus is a moth of the family Pterophoridae. It is known from the Democratic Republic of Congo, Ethiopia and Nigeria.

References

aethiopicus
Plume moths of Africa
Moths of Africa
Moths described in 1963
Taxa named by Hans Georg Amsel